Maʿrūf Karkhī, known also by his full name Abū Maḥfūẓ Maʿrūf Ibn Firūz al-Karkhī, was a Sufi Muslim saint.

Biography 
Maruf was born in the district of Wasit or Karkh in Baghdad. His father's name was Firuz, which suggests that he was of Persian origin. Attar narrates in his Memorial of the Saints that Maruf converted to Islam at a young age at the hands of Ali ibn Musa, after rejecting all forms of polytheism. Tradition recounts that he immediately went and told his father and mother, who rejoiced at his decision and became Muslims themselves. After accepting Islam, Maruf became a student of Dawud Ta'i, and underwent a severe trial of his discipleship. Maruf, however, remained steadfast and proved himself so devout that his righteousness became locally famous.

Sufi tradition
In Sufism, those of the order of Marufi are those connected to Maruf Karkhi. Maruf thus forms a penultimate link in what is known as the Zahabiya genealogy (Golden Chain or silsilah) of Sufism, the initiation line which forms an unbroken chain to Muhammad. Maruf, being the disciple of Ali al-Ridha, formed part of that lineage, while at the same time maintaining the teachings of his master Dawud Ta'i and thus being his successor as well. Sufis venerate Maruf highly for the multiple spiritual chains which interlock in his teachings.

See also 
 List of Sufis
 Seyyed Qutb al-Din Mohammad Neyrizi

Notes

Converts to Islam
People from Baghdad
Sunni Sufis
Sufi mystics